This is the 9th season for the Boston Cannons in Major League Lacrosse. The Cannons played in their home games at Harvard Stadium.

Current roster

updated 1 September 2009

External links
Boston Cannons official site

Lacrosse teams in Boston
Major League Lacrosse seasons
Boston Cannons Season, 2009
2009 in sports in Massachusetts